Teinturier grapes are grapes whose flesh and juice is red in colour due to anthocyanin pigments accumulating within the pulp of the grape berry itself.  In most cases, anthocyanin pigments are confined to the outer skin tissue only, and the squeezed grape juice of most dark-skinned grape varieties is clear. The red color of red wine comes from anthocyanins extracted from the macerated (crushed) skins, over a period of days during the fermentation process. The name teinturier comes from French, meaning to dye or to stain.

Wines
Teinturier varieties, while containing a lot of color, usually make special wines, perhaps due to a higher level of tannins, compounds structurally related to the anthocyanins. Many winemakers blend small volumes of teinturier juices into their wines, to boost the colour, without dramatically impacting the taste.

Examples

Alicante Bouschet
Alicante Ganzin
Carolina Black Rose
Chambourcin 
Colorino
Dunkelfelder
Gamay de Bouze
Grand Noir de la Calmette
Karmrahyut
Maréchal Foch
Maroo Seedless
Morrastel Bouschet
Petit Bouschet
Royalty
Rubired
Salvador
Saperavi

References

Red wine grape varieties